The South Atlantic Anomaly (SAA) is an area where Earth's inner Van Allen radiation belt comes closest to Earth's surface, dipping down to an altitude of . This leads to an increased flux of energetic particles in this region and exposes orbiting satellites (including the ISS) to higher-than-usual levels of ionizing radiation.

The effect is caused by the non-concentricity of Earth and its magnetic dipole and has been observed to be increasing in intensity recently. The SAA is the near-Earth region where Earth's magnetic field is weakest relative to an idealized Earth-centered dipole field.

Definition
The area of the SAA is confined by the intensity of Earth's magnetic field at less than 32,000 nanotesla at sea level, which corresponds to the dipolar magnetic field at ionospheric altitudes. However, the field itself varies in intensity as a gradient.

Position and shape

The Van Allen radiation belts are symmetric about the Earth's magnetic axis, which is tilted with respect to the Earth's rotational axis by an angle of approximately 11°.

If Earth's magnetism is represented by a bar magnet of small size but strong intensity ("magnetic dipole"), the SAA variation can be illustrated by placing the magnet not in the plane of the Equator, but some small distance North, shifted more or less in the direction of Singapore. As a result, over northern South America and the south Atlantic, near Singapore's antipodal point, the magnetic field is relatively weak, resulting in a lower repulsion to trapped particles of the radiation belts there, and as a result these particles reach deeper into the upper atmosphere than they otherwise would.

The shape of the SAA changes over time. Since its initial discovery in 1958, the southern limits of the SAA have remained roughly constant while a long-term expansion has been measured to the northwest, the north, the northeast, and the east. Additionally, the shape and particle density of the SAA varies on a diurnal basis, with greatest particle density corresponding roughly to local noon. The highest intensity portion of the SAA drifts to the west at a speed of about 0.3° per year, and is noticeable in the references listed below. The drift rate of the SAA is very close to the rotation differential between the Earth's core and its surface, estimated to be between 0.3° and 0.5° per year.

Current literature suggests that a slow weakening of the geomagnetic field is one of several causes for the changes in the borders of the SAA since its discovery. As the geomagnetic field continues to weaken, the inner Van Allen belt gets closer to the Earth, with a commensurate enlargement of the SAA at given altitudes.

Intensity and effects

The South Atlantic Anomaly is of great significance to astronomical satellites and other spacecraft that orbit the Earth at several hundred kilometers altitude; these orbits take satellites through the anomaly periodically, exposing them to several minutes of strong ionizing radiation, caused by the trapped protons in the inner Van Allen belt.

Measurements on Space shuttle flight STS-94 have ascertained that absorbed dose rates from charged particles have extended from 112 to 175 μGy/day, with dose equivalent rates ranging from 264.3 to 413 μSv/day.

The International Space Station, orbiting with an inclination of 51.6°, requires extra shielding to deal with this problem. The Hubble Space Telescope does not take observations while passing through the SAA. Passing through the anomaly caused false alarms on Skylab Apollo Telescope Mount's solar flare sensor. Astronauts are also affected by this region, which is said to be the cause of peculiar "shooting stars" (phosphenes) seen in the visual field of astronauts, an effect termed cosmic ray visual phenomena. Passing through the South Atlantic Anomaly is thought to be the reason for the failures of the Globalstar network's satellites in 2007.

The PAMELA experiment, while passing through the SAA, detected antiproton levels that were orders of magnitude higher than expected. This suggests the Van Allen belt confines antiparticles produced by the interaction of the Earth's upper atmosphere with cosmic rays.

NASA has reported that modern laptops have crashed when Space Shuttle flights passed through the anomaly.

In October 2012, the SpaceX CRS-1 Dragon spacecraft attached to the International Space Station experienced a transient problem as it passed through the anomaly.

The SAA is believed to have started a series of events leading to the destruction of the Hitomi, Japan's most powerful X-ray observatory.  The anomaly transiently disabled a direction-finding mechanism, causing the satellite to rely solely on gyroscopes that were not working properly, after which it spun out of control, losing its solar panels in the process.

See also
Geomagnetic reversal
Geomagnetic storm
Operation Argus
Space weather

References

External links
  Section "Magnetic flip" contains a video showing the growth and movement of the South Atlantic Anomaly over the last 400 years.

Atlantic Ocean
Magnetic anomalies
Magnetic field of the Earth
Space plasmas
Geology of South America